Wolf Pond may refer to:

 Wolf Pond (Five Ponds, Herkimer County, New York)
 Wolf Pond (Oswegatchie, Herkimer County, New York)
 Wolf Pond (Bellmont, Franklin County, New York)